The Reverend Stafford Poole, C.M., (March 6, 1930 – November 1, 2020) was a Catholic priest and a research historian. He was formerly a professor of history at, and later served as President of, the former St. John's Seminary College (closed 2002) in Camarillo, California. Additionally, he is known for his extensive writings about the history of the Catholic Church in Mexico and the devotion to the Virgin of Guadalupe.

Early life
Poole was born in Oxnard, California, the son of Beatrice Hessie Smith and Joseph Outhwaite Poole, Sr., and was raised in North Hollywood. While in grammar schools there, his classmates included both the sons of the noted singer, Bing Crosby, as well as the future Cardinal Roger Mahony. For high school, he attended Los Angeles College, which was a minor seminary run by the Archdiocese of Los Angeles for high-school age boys who were considering the priesthood.

Studies
Upon his graduation in 1947 he joined the Congregation of the Mission of Saint Vincent de Paul, taking his vows in 1949. He did his seminary studies at the Vincentian seminary in Perryville, Missouri, earning a bachelor's degree in 1952. He completed his theological studies and was ordained in 1956, afterwards teaching in seminaries in the Midwestern United States. He received a Master's degree in Spanish literature in 1958 and then in 1961 his doctorate in history, both from St. Louis University.

Although his focus had been American and European history, Poole's dissertation was titled "The Indian Problem in the Third Mexican Provincial Council, 1585" in which he analyzed recently found documents from the first Provincial Councils of the Catholic Church in Mexico.

Authorship
Poole wrote an article in 1964 for the Jesuit magazine America entitled Tomorrow's Seminaries, in which he reflected on his experiences from teaching seminarians. The article was a sensation in Church circles, and he was soon approached to write a book on the topic. He contracted with the American branch of the German publishing house Herder & Herder, which specialized in works on Catholic topics. They published his book, Seminary in Crisis in 1965. He was involved as an expert consultant on seminary formation for the United States Conference of Bishops and other authorities for the next twenty years.

He continued to take an interest in the Council which he had studied for his dissertation, and wrote several articles on it for scholarly journals with Hispanic focus. As a result, he was led to translate the Apologia of the Spanish Dominican friar and bishop, Bartolomé de las Casas, who was a major defender of Native American rights in the new colonies of the Spanish Empire. This was a Latin work of the speeches Las Casas delivered at the Valladolid debate of 1550-1551. This was published in 1974 by Northern Illinois University Press; a second edition appeared in 1992 and is still in print.

Poole also researched the life of Pedro Moya de Contreras, the third Archbishop of Mexico, who had convoked and presided at the Third Mexican Council.  This biography was published by the University of California Press in 1987.  A second, revised edition was published by the University of Oklahoma Press in 2011, and a Spanish translation by the Colegio de Michoacán, Mexico. His research into the archbishop's life caused him to be interested in that of the prelate's mentor, Juan de Ovando. In 2004 the University of Oklahoma Press published the biography, Juan de Ovando: Governing the Spanish Empire in the Reign of Philip II.

In 1971 Poole was assigned to teach Church history at St. John's Seminary College, which at that time was administered by his religious congregation for the Archdiocese of Los Angeles. He was appointed President of the College in 1980, but resigned in 1984 due to a disagreement with the Archdiocese about structural changes in the school.

Guadalupan studies
After his retirement from active teaching in 1990, Poole became the archivist for the Western Province of his Congregation.

In addition to that, though, he was able to work on an interest he had long felt on the history of the apparitions of Our Lady of Guadalupe. For this he undertook the study of Classical Nahuatl, and  published several works in that field.

Poole's writings regarding Our Lady of Guadalupe include the books Our Lady of Guadalupe: The Origins and Sources of a Mexican National Symbol, 1531-1797, an English translation of Luis Laso de la Vega's Nahuatl account of the apparition, Huei tlamahuiçoltica, and a translation and critical edition of two Nahuatl plays about the Virgin. In 2006 he published The Guadalupan Controversies in Mexico, where, along with other experts in the field, he disputed the historicity of Juan Diego, the Aztec man to whom the Virgin is believed to have appeared. Poole opposed the efforts to have him declared a saint, in which he was ultimately unsuccessful.

References

List of works

, foreword by Martin Marty, translated by Stafford Poole 

 Edited and Translated by Lisa Sousa, Stafford Poole, C.M., and James Lockhart 
 
 
 Edited by Barry D. Sell, Louise M. Burkhart, Stafford Poole 
 
 Translated by: Barry D. Sell & Stafford Poole 
Idea of a New General History of North America: An Account of Colonial Native Mexico by Lorenzo Boturini Benaduci. University of Oklahoma Press, 2015. Stafford Poole (Translator), Susan Schroeder Ph.D (Foreword)

External sources
 
 Missouri State University Press "Biography" 

21st-century American historians
21st-century American male writers
American Roman Catholic priests
American historians of religion
People from Oxnard, California
People from Greater Los Angeles
Our Lady of Guadalupe
Translators from Nahuatl
American Mesoamericanists
Aztec scholars
Historians of Mesoamerica
2020 deaths
1930 births
20th-century Mesoamericanists
21st-century Mesoamericanists
Saint Louis University alumni
Vincentians
American religion academics
St. John's Seminary (California)
20th-century translators
21st-century translators
Catholics from California
Historians from California
American male non-fiction writers